Tony Gallegos (1924-2018) was an American businessman, World War II veteran and politician of Mexican American and Native American descent.  Gallegos served in the U.S. Army Air Force, from 1943 to 1946. A native of Montrose, Colorado (born February 13, 1924), he served as a flight engineer in the U.S. Army Air Corps during World War II, flying 17 missions in a B-17 bomber. After the war, he received a bachelor of arts from the Bistram Institute of Fine Arts (B.A., 1952) in California.  Prior to his appointment as a Commissioner of the U.S. Equal Employment Opportunity Commission, Gallegos worked at the Douglas Aircraft Company in California in a number of managerial positions from 1952 to 1982, and became corporate art director.

On February 4, 1982 President Ronald Reagan nominated Gallegos to be a Commissioner on the Equal Employment Opportunity Commission (EEOC) for a term to expire July 1, 1984. President Reagan renominated Tony for a follow-on term on the EEOC to expire July 1, 1989. On November 21, 1989, President George H. W. Bush announced his intention (reappointment) to nominate Tony E. Gallegos to be a member of the Equal Employment Opportunity Commission for the term expiring July 1, 1994. When on April 5, 1993 President Bill Clinton designated Commissioner Gallegos as Acting Chairman of the EEOC, he became the Commission's first Hispanic leader to serve in this capacity. During his tenure at the EEOC, Gallegos expanded the agency's Tribal Employment Rights Organizations Program.  As Commissioner of the EEOC, he initiated the 1983 Hispanic Charge Study.  This study reviewed the allocation of resources and improved the productivity of operations agency-wide in the processing of Equal Employment Charges received by the EEOC.  On November 16, 1993, Gallegos as Chairman of the EEOC, entered into an agreement (Memorandum of Understanding) with the National Labor Relations Board (NLRB) for the enforcement of Title I of the Americans with Disabilities Act (ADA) and Section 8 of the National Labor Relations Act (NLRA).  In total, Commissioner Gallegos served on the EEOC from 1982 to 1994, completing his service as Acting Chairman.
 
Gallegos has been an advisory member of the U.S. Senate Task Force on Hispanic Affairs.  He was also board president of Mexican American Opportunity Foundation (MAOF) which is a non-profit community organization whose goal is to serve disadvantaged individuals and families in Los Angeles, California.  MAOF is the largest Latino-oriented family services organization in the United States.  He was an active member of the American G.I. Forum. As such, he served as the commander of the Pico Rivera Chapter, California State commander, and eventually as National Chairman of the American G.I. Forum. He was also Vice-Chairman of SER-Job for Progress, and a member of the Office of Economic Development Programs for Los Angeles County. He has received commendations from the State of California, the City of Los Angeles, and from federal and county-level legislative Bodies, as well as from national Hispanic organizations for his achievements and contributions to the Mexican-American community. He was the President and CEO of Veterans in Community Service, Inc.

Gallegos died on May 9, 2018.

See also
American G.I. Forum  http://www.eeoc.gov/policy/docs/eeoc-nlrb-ada.html

References

External links
Congresswoman Grace Napolitano Honors Tony Gallegos In the Congressional Record - American GI Forum

American people of Mexican descent
Businesspeople from Los Angeles
Chairs of the Equal Employment Opportunity Commission
2018 deaths
1924 births
20th-century American businesspeople
American military personnel of World War II